Ryōma is a Japanese given name. It can be written with several kanji, including 龍馬 (which directly translate to "dragon" and "horse")

The following people and fictional characters have the name Ryōma:

Hashimoto Ryōma, Japanese basketball player
Sakamoto Ryōma, a late-Edo Era notable
Ryoma Matsuda, Japanese baseball player
, Japanese footballer
, Japanese triple jumper

Fictional characters 
Ryoma Echizen, main character of The Prince of Tennis
Ryoma Nagare, first pilot of Getter Robo
Ryoma, character in Power Stone
Ryouma, the main character of Seijuu Sentai Gingaman
Ryoma, character in Fire Emblem Fates
Ryouma Kagawa, the main character of Tokkei Winspector
Ryoma Sengoku, a New Generation Rider in Kamen Rider Gaim
Ryouma Ichijou, the main character in Love Stage!!
Ryoma Hoshi, a character in Danganronpa V3: Killing Harmony
Ryoma Terasaka, a character in Assassination Classroom
Ryoma, a character in Arena of Valor

Japanese masculine given names